Vicente Sarmiento Urgello (April 22, 1875 – May 3, 1952) was a Filipino lawyer and legislator from Cebu, Philippines. He was a member of the House of the Representatives for Cebu's 3rd district from 1916 until 1922.

Early life 
Vicente S. Urgello was born in Carcar, Cebu to parents Francisco Basa Urgello and Telesfora Canarias Sarmiento on April 22, 1875. He became a lawyer on October 7, 1907 and owned big real estate properties in Cebu City. The street that was named after him used to be his private property and was previously known as Private Road.

Career 
He practiced law and was considered a prominent lawyer in his time. 

His political career began when Filemon Sotto resigned from his position as Congressman of the 3rd district and ran for a seat in the Senate. A special congressional election was held and Urgello was elected to finish Sotto's term in the 3rd Philippine Legislature. Urgello would be reelected for another term in 1916 and again in 1919. He served as Congressman until 1922.

On October 2, 1939, then President Manuel L. Quezon appointed him as member of the Board of Tax Appeals for Cebu City.

He died on May 3, 1952.

Historical commemoration 

 The Vicente S. Urgello Street was named in his honor. It starts from Barangay Sambag I and ends at the Sergio Osmeña Boulevard.

Further reading 

 Biografia de Vicente Urgello, National Library of the Philippines

References 

1875 births
1952 deaths
20th-century Filipino lawyers
Members of the Philippine Legislature
Members of the House of Representatives of the Philippines from Cebu